For the Dallas, Texas, based airline that flew in 1978, see Kitty Hawk Airways.

Kitty Hawk Aircargo was an American cargo airline based on the grounds of Dallas/Fort Worth International Airport and in Grapevine, Texas, U.S. It operated domestic scheduled overnight freight services, as well as air charter services. Its main base was Dallas-Fort Worth International Airport, with a hub at Fort Wayne International Airport.

History

On 15 October 2007 Kitty Hawk, Inc. filed again for Chapter 11 bankruptcy.

On 29 October 2007 Kitty Hawk, Inc. announced it would cease all scheduled network Air and Ground operations, effective immediately, but that it would continue to operate air cargo charter shipments.

On 20 November 2007 Kitty Hawk Air Cargo began flying for DHL for a two-week minimum, shipping DHL's freight domestically. This contract was for five Boeing 737-300s including keeping one at DHL's hub as a backup. Kitty Hawk continued this flying for four weeks.

Kitty Hawk flew its last revenue flight, a Boeing 727 horse charter, on January 8, 2008 and its last ever flight the next day, ferrying the aircraft to Ardmore, Oklahoma.

Destinations
Overnight cargo services were operated daily to the following domestic destinations: Atlanta, Austin,  Baltimore, Boston, Buffalo, Charlotte, Chicago, Cincinnati, Cleveland, Columbus, Dallas/Ft Worth, Dayton, Denver, Detroit, El Paso, Fort Wayne, Grand Rapids, Hartford, Honolulu, Houston, Indianapolis, Jacksonville, Kansas City, Lexington, Las Vegas, Lexington, Los Angeles, Louisville,  Memphis, Miami, Milwaukee, Minneapolis/St Paul, Nashville, New York, Newark, Norfolk,  Oakland, Omaha, Orlando, Philadelphia, Phoenix, Pittsburgh, Portland, Raleigh, Richmond, St. Louis, Salt Lake City, San Diego, San Francisco, Seattle, South Bend, Tampa, and Washington, DC.
Freight services were operated to the following international destinations: San Juan, Puerto Rico and Toronto, Canada.
Additional interline partners used to service the following destinations: Anchorage and Honolulu.

Fleet
As of December 2007 the Kitty Hawk Aircargo fleet included: 

As of November 17, 2007, the majority of the 727s from the Kitty Hawk fleet were being stored at Ardmore Municipal Airport in Ardmore, Oklahoma.

Previously operated

As of March 2006 the airline operated:
18 Boeing 727-200F
7 Boeing 737-300SF
7 Convair 640
3 Lockheed L-1011F

See also 
 List of defunct airlines of the United States

References

External links

 Kitty Hawk Aircargo (Archive)

Defunct airlines of the United States
Airlines established in 1976
Airlines disestablished in 2008
Defunct cargo airlines
Airlines based in Texas
Defunct companies based in Texas
Companies that filed for Chapter 11 bankruptcy in 2000
Companies that filed for Chapter 11 bankruptcy in 2007
1976 establishments in Texas
2008 disestablishments in Texas